The following is a hierarchical outline for the Italian Army at the end of the Cold War. It is intended to convey the connections and relationships between units and formations.

The article is based on the 1984 publication of the Italian Army's order of battle by the Institute for Disarmament, Development and Peace (Istituto di ricerche per il disarmo, lo sviluppo e la pace (IRDISP) in Rome (a think tank of the Radical Party). The published order of battle, down to company level, can be found at the Radical's Radio's website (Link). The structure was then adapted with information from the Italian Army's website and its units' histories listed there. Additionally the following website was used, which lists every Order of Battle for Italy's armies from 1553 to 1997, Link. Specifically the Order of Battle after the 1986 reform was used, which was then corrected and expanded with the Italian Army's website information.

Graphic of the Italian Army in 1989

Army General Staff 
The Army General Staff in Rome oversaw all Italian Army units. However, in the event of war the three Corps' in Northern Italy would have come under command of NATO's Allied Land Forces Southern Europe (LANDSOUTH) Command in Verona.

3rd Army Corps 

 3rd Army Corps, in Milan:
 3rd Army Corps Command Unit, in Milan
 Artillery Command, in Vercelli
  Horse Artillery Regiment, in Milan
 Command Battery, in Milan
 1st Self-propelled Field Artillery Group "Gioacchino Bellezza", (M109 155mm self-propelled howitzers), in Milan
 2nd Self-propelled Field Artillery Group "Sergio Bresciani", (M109 155mm self-propelled howitzers), in Cremona
 3rd Heavy Field Artillery Group (Reserve), (M59 155/45 towed howitzers), in Cremona
 3rd Battery, 30th Artillery Specialists Group "Brianza", in Milan
  131st Heavy Field Artillery Group "Vercelli", in Vercelli, (FH70 155mm towed howitzers)
  205th Heavy Field Artillery Group "Lomellina", in Vercelli, (FH70 155mm towed howitzers)
 11th Light Anti-aircraft Artillery Group "Falco" (Reserve), in Vercelli
  12th Artillery Specialists Group "Biella", in Vercelli
 30th Artillery Specialist Group "Brianza" (Reserve), in Milan
 Engineer Command, in Novara
  3rd Pioneer Battalion "Lario", in Pavia
  131st Pioneer Battalion "Ticino", in Bellinzago Novarese
 Signal Command, in Milan
  3rd Signal Battalion "Spluga", in Milan
  231st Signal Battalion "Sempione", in Novara
 Light Aviation Command, at Bresso Air Base
 23rd Recon Helicopters Squadrons Group "Eridano", at Bresso Air Base
 423rd Recon Helicopter Squadron (AB-206)
 461st Recon Helicopter Squadron (AB-206)
 462nd Recon Helicopter Squadron (AB-206)
 53rd Multirole Helicopters Squadrons Group "Cassiopea", at Bresso Air Base
 531st Multirole Helicopter Squadron (AB-205) 
 532nd Multirole Helicopter Squadron (AB-205)
  33rd Logistic Maneuver Battalion "Ambrosiano", in Novara

Armored Brigade "Centauro" 
  Armored Brigade "Centauro", in Novara
 Command and Signal Unit "Centauro", in Novara
  1st Tank Battalion "M.O. Cracco", in Bellinzago Novarese, (Leopard 1A2 main battle tanks)
  101st Tank Battalion "M.O. Zappalà", in Bellinzago Novarese, (Leopard 1A2 main battle tanks)
  28th Bersaglieri Battalion "Oslavia", in Bellinzago Novarese, (VCC-2 armored personnel carriers)
  9th Self-propelled Field Artillery Group "Brennero", in Vercelli, (M109 155mm self-propelled howitzers)
  Logistic Battalion "Centauro", in Bellinzago Novarese
 Anti-tank Company "Centauro", in Bellinzago Novarese
 Engineer Company "Centauro", in Novara

Mechanized Brigade "Goito" 
  Mechanized Brigade "Goito" in Milan
 Command and Signal Unit "Goito", in Milan
  4th Tank Battalion "M.O. Passalacqua", in Solbiate Olona, (Leopard 1A2 main battle tanks)
  6th Bersaglieri Battalion "Palestro", in Turin, (VCC-2 armored personnel carriers)
  10th Bersaglieri Battalion "Bezzecca", in Solbiate Olona, (VCC-2 armored personnel carriers)
  18th Bersaglieri Battalion "Poggio Scanno", in Milan, (VCC-2 armored personnel carriers)
  3rd Self-propelled Field Artillery Group "Pastrengo", in Vercelli, (M109 155mm self-propelled howitzers)
  Logistic Battalion "Goito", in Monza
 Anti-tank Company "Goito", in Turin
 Engineer Company "Goito", in Novara

Mechanized Brigade "Legnano" 
  Mechanized Brigade "Legnano", in Bergamo
 Command and Signal Unit "Legnano", in Bergamo
  20th Tank Battalion "M.O. Pentimalli", in Legnano, (Leopard 1A2 main battle tanks)
  2nd Bersaglieri Battalion "Governolo", in Legnano, (VCC-2 armored personnel carriers)
  67th Mechanized Infantry Battalion "Montelungo", in Monza, (M113 armored personnel carriers)
  68th Mechanized Infantry Battalion "Palermo", in Bergamo, (M113 armored personnel carriers, disbanded on 30 November 1989)
  11th Field Artillery Group "Monferrato", in Cremona, (M114 155mm towed howitzers)
  Logistic Battalion "Legnano", in Presezzo
 Anti-tank Company "Legnano", in Monza
 Engineer Company "Legnano", in Bergamo

Mechanized Brigade "Trieste" 
  Mechanized Brigade "Trieste", in Bologna
 Command and Signal Unit "Trieste", in Bologna
  11th Tank Battalion "M.O. Calzecchi", in Ozzano dell'Emilia, (Leopard 1A2 main battle tanks)
  37th Mechanized Infantry Battalion "Ravenna", in Bologna, (VCC-2 armored personnel carriers)
  40th Mechanized Infantry Battalion "Bologna", in Bologna, (VCC-2 armored personnel carriers)
  66th Mechanized Infantry Battalion "Valtellina", in Forlì, (VCC-2 armored personnel carriers)
  21st Artillery Group "Romagna", in Bologna, (M114 155mm towed howitzers)
  Logistic Battalion "Trieste", in Budrio
 Anti-tank Company "Trieste", in Bologna
 Engineer Company "Trieste", in Bologna

Mechanized Brigade "Brescia" 
  Mechanized Brigade "Brescia", in Brescia
  Command and Signal Unit "Brescia", in Brescia
  15th Tank Squadrons Group "Cavalleggeri di Lodi", in Lenta (Leopard 1A2 main battle tanks)
  20th Mechanized Infantry Battalion "Monte San Michele", in Brescia, (VCC-1 armored personnel carriers)
  30th Mechanized Infantry Battalion "Pisa", in Montorio Veronese, (VCC-1 armored personnel carriers)
  85th Mechanized Infantry Battalion "Verona", in Montorio Veronese, (VCC-1 armored personnel carriers, reduced to reserve unit on 30 November 1989)
  52nd Field Artillery Group "Venaria", in Brescia, (M114 155mm towed howitzers)
  Logistic Battalion "Brescia", in Montorio Veronese
 Anti-tank Company "Brescia", in Montorio Veronese
 Engineer Company "Brescia", in Montorio Veronese

Motorized Brigade "Cremona" 
  Motorized Brigade "Cremona", in Turin
 Command and Signal Unit "Cremona", in Turin
  1st Armored Squadrons Group "Nizza Cavalleria", in Pinerolo, (two Leopard 1A2 tank companies and one VCC-2 mech infantry company)
  21st Motorized Infantry Battalion "Alfonsine", in Alessandria
  22nd Infantry (Recruits Training) Battalion "Primaro", in Fossano
  157th Motorized Infantry Battalion "Liguria", in Novi Ligure
  7th Field Artillery Group "Adria", in Turin, (M114 155mm towed howitzers)
  Logistic Battalion "Cremona", in Venaria Reale
 Anti-tank Company "Cremona", in Turin
 Engineer Company "Cremona", in Pinerolo

4th Army Corps 

 4th Alpine Army Corps, in Bolzano:
 4th Alpine Army Corps Command Unit, in Bolzano
 Artillery Command, in Trento
  4th Heavy Field Artillery Group "Pusteria", in Trento, (FH70 155mm towed howitzers)
  184th Heavy Field Artillery Group "Filottrano", in Trento, (FH70 155mm towed howitzers)
  3rd Artillery Specialists Group "Bondone", in Trento
 Engineer Command, in Bolzano
  2nd Combat Engineer Battalion "Iseo", in Bolzano
  4th Pioneer Battalion "Orta", in Trento
 Signal Command, in Bolzano
  4th Signal Battalion "Gardena", in Bolzano
 7th Signal Company, in Bassano del Grappa
  4th Army Aviation Regiment "Altair", at Bolzano-San Giacomo Air Base
 24th Army Light Aviation Squadrons Group "Orione", at Bolzano-San Giacomo Air Base (transformed in Support and Command Unit on 20 September 1989)
 241st Light Airplanes Squadron (SM-1019) (disbanded on 20 September 1989)
 440th Recon Helicopters Squadron (AB-206) (reassigned to the 54th Squadrons Group "Cefeo" on 20 September 1989)
 34th Army Air Aviation Squadrons Group "Toro", at Venaria Reale Air Base
 441st Recon Helicopters Squadron (AB-206)
 544th Multirole Helicopters Squadrons (AB-205)
 44th Recon Helicopters Squadrons Group "Fenice", at Belluno Air Base
 441st Recon Helicopters Squadron (AB-206)
 544th Multirole Helicopters Squadron (AB-205)
 54th Multirole Helicopters Squadrons Group "Cefeo", at Bolzano-San Giacomo Air Base
 541st Multirole Helicopters Squadrons (AB-205)
 542nd Multirole Helicopters Squadrons (AB-205)
 543rd Multirole Helicopters Squadrons (AB-205)
  3rd Armored Squadrons Group "Savoia Cavalleria", in Merano, (two Leopard 1A2 tank companies and one VCC-2 mech infantry company)
  24th Maneuver Logistic Battalion "Dolomiti", in Bolzano
 7th Armored Carabinieri Battalion "M.O. Petrucelli", in Laives, (one M47 Patton tank company, two M113 mech infantry companies and one M113/120mm heavy mortars company)
 Alpini Paratroopers Company "Monte Cervino", in Eppan

Alpine Brigade "Taurinense" 
  Alpine Brigade "Taurinense", in Turin
 Command and Signal Unit "Taurinense", in Turin
  Alpini Battalion "Saluzzo", in Borgo San Dalmazzo
  Alpini Battalion "Susa", in Pinerolo
  Alpini (Recruits Training) Battalion "Mondovì", in Cuneo
  (*)Mountain Artillery Group "Aosta", in Saluzzo, (M114 155mm towed howitzers)
  Mountain Artillery Group "Pinerolo, in Susa, (M56 105mm pack howitzers)
  (*)Logistic Battalion "Taurinense", in Rivoli
 (*)Anti-tank Company "Taurinense", in Turin
 Engineer Company "Taurinense", in Abbadia Alpina
 (*)Airmobile Medical Unit "Taurinense", in Rivoli
 The units marked with an (*) were earmarked for the NATO AMF(L) (Allied Mobile Force (Land))

Alpine Brigade "Orobica" 
  Alpine Brigade "Orobica", in Merano
 Command and Signal Unit "Orobica", in Merano
  Alpini Battalion "Morbegno", in Sterzing
  Alpini Battalion "Tirano", in Mals
  Alpini (Recruits Training) Battalion "Edolo", in Merano
  Mountain Artillery Group "Bergamo", in Schlanders, (M56 105mm pack howitzers) 
  Mountain Artillery Group "Sondrio", in Sterzing, (M114 155mm towed howitzers, disbanded 1989, howitzers reassigned to the "Bergamo" Group)
  Logistic Battalion "Orobica", in Merano
 Anti-tank Company "Orobica", in Merano
 Engineer Company "Orobica", in Merano

Alpine Brigade "Tridentina" 
  Alpine Brigade "Tridentina", in Brixen
 Command and Signal Unit "Tridentina", in Brixen
  Alpini Battalion "Bassano", in Innichen
  Alpini Battalion "Trento", in Welsberg
 262nd Alpini (Fortification) Company "Val Cismon", in Innichen
 Alpini (Fortification) Battalion "Val Brenta" (Reserve), in Innichen
 Alpini Battalion "Bolzano" (Reserve), in Bruneck
  Mountain Artillery Group "Asiago", in Toblach, (M56 105mm pack howitzers)
  Mountain Artillery Group "Vicenza", in Elvas, (M114 155mm towed howitzers)
  Logistic Battalion "Tridentina", in Vahrn
 Anti-tank Company "Tridentina", in Bruneck
 Engineer Company "Tridentina", in Brixen

Alpine Brigade "Cadore" 
  Alpine Brigade "Cadore", in Belluno
 Command and Signal Unit "Cadore", in Belluno
  Alpini Battalion "Feltre", in Feltre
  Alpini Battalion "Pieve di Cadore", in Tai di Cadore
  Alpini (Recruits Training) Battalion "Belluno", in Belluno
  Mountain Artillery Group "Lanzo", in Belluno, (M56 105mm pack howitzers)
  Mountain Artillery Group "Agordo", in Bassano del Grappa, (M114 155mm towed howitzers)
  Logistic Battalion "Cadore", in Belluno
 Anti-tank Company "Cadore", in Belluno
 Engineer Company "Cadore", in Belluno

Alpine Brigade "Julia" 
  Alpine Brigade "Julia", in Udine
 Command and Signal Unit "Julia", in Udine
  Alpini Battalion "Cividale", in Chiusaforte
  Alpini Battalion "Gemona", in Tarvisio
  Alpini Battalion "L'Aquila", in L'Aquila 
  Alpini Battalion "Tolmezzo", in Paluzza
  Alpini (Fortifications) Battalion "Val Tagliamento", in Tolmezzo
  Alpini (Recruits Training) Battalion "Vicenza", in Codroipo
  Mountain Artillery Group "Belluno", in Pontebba, (M56 105mm pack howitzers, disbanded on 31 October 1989)
  Mountain Artillery Group "Udine", in Tolmezzo, (M56 105mm pack howitzers)
  Mountain Artillery Group "Conegliano", in Udine, (M114 155mm towed howitzers)
 15th Mountain Artillery Battery, in L'Aquila  (M56 105mm pack howitzers)
  Logistic Battalion "Julia", in Vacile di Spilimbergo
 Anti-tank Company "Julia", in Cavazzo Carnico
 Engineer Company "Julia", in Gemona

5th Army Corps 

 5th Army Corps, in Vittorio Veneto:
 5th Army Corps Command Unit, in Vittorio Veneto
 Artillery Command, in Portogruaro
  5th Heavy Field Artillery Group "Superga", in Udine, (FH70 155mm towed howitzers)
  9th Heavy Artillery Group "Rovigo", in Verona, (M115 203mm towed howitzers)
  14th Field Artillery Group "Murge", in Trieste, (M114 155mm towed howitzers)
  33rd Heavy Field Artillery Group "Terni", in Treviso, (FH70 155mm towed howitzers)
  132nd Heavy Field Artillery Group "Rovereto", in Casarsa della Delizia, (FH70 155mm towed howitzers)
  155th Heavy Field Artillery Group "Emilia", in Udine, (FH70 155mm towed howitzers)
  5th Artillery Specialists Group "Medea", in Udine
  6th Artillery Specialists Group "Montello", in Treviso
 7th Artillery Specialists Group "Casarsa" (Reserve), in Casarsa della Delizia
  41st Artillery Specialists Group "Cordenons", in Pordenone
 12th Light Anti-aircraft Artillery Group "Nibbio" (Reserve), in Udine
 13th Light Anti-aircraft Artillery Group "Condor" (Reserve), in Treviso
 14th Light Anti-aircraft Artillery Group "Astore" (Reserve), in Casarsa della Delizia 
 Engineer Command, in Udine
  1st Mining Engineer Battalion "Garda", in Udine
  3rd Combat Engineers Battalion "Verbano", in Udine
  5th Pioneer Battalion "Bolsena", in Udine
  132nd Combat Engineers Battalion "Livenza", in Motta di Livenza
  184th Combat Engineers Battalion "Santerno", in Villa Vicentina
 Signal Command, in Treviso
  5th Signal Battalion "Rolle", in Sacile
  33rd Electronic Warfare Battalion "Falzarego", in Conegliano
  107th Signal Battalion "Predil", in Udine
  184th Signal Battalion "Cansiglio", in Treviso
  232nd Signal Battalion "Fadalto", in Casarsa della Delizia
  5th Army Light Aviation Regiment "Rigel""', in Casarsa della Delizia
 25th Army Light Aviation Squadrons Group "Cigno", in Campoformido
 425th Recon Helicopters Squadron (AB-206), in Vittorio Veneto
 481st Recon Helicopters Squadron (AB-206) 
 482nd Recon Helicopters Squadron (AB-206) 
 49th Reconnaissance Helicopters Squadrons Group "Capricorno", in Casarsa della Delizia
 491st Recon Helicopters Squadron (AB-206)
 55th Multirole Helicopters Squadrons Group "Dragone", in Casarsa della Delizia
 551st Multirole Helicopter Squadron (AB-205)
 552nd Multirole Helicopter Squadron (AB-205)
 553rd Multirole Helicopter Squadron (AB-205)
 13th Armored Carabinieri Battalion "M.O. Gallo", in Gorizia, (one Leopard 1A2 tank company, two VCC-2 mech infantry companies and one VCC-2/120mm heavy mortars company)
  5th Maneuver Logistic Battalion "Euganeo", in Treviso
  8th Maneuver Logistic Battalion "Carso", in Orzano di Remanzacco
  50th Maneuver Logistic Battalion "Carnia", in Pordenone

 Armored Brigade "Mameli" 
  Armored Brigade "Mameli", in Tauriano
 Command and Signal Unit "Mameli", in Tauriano
  19th Reconnaissance Squadrons Group "Cavalleggeri Guide", in Casarsa della Delizia (two Leopard 1A2 tank companies and one VCC-2 mech infantry company)
  3rd Tank Battalion "M.O. Galas", in Tauriano, (M60A1 main battle tanks)
  5th Tank Battalion "M.O. Chiamenti", in Tauriano, (M60A1 main battle tanks)
  23rd Bersaglieri Battalion "Castel di Borgo", in Tauriano, (VCC-1 armored personnel carriers)
  12th Self-propelled Field Artillery Group "Capua", in Vacile, (M109 155mm self-propelled howitzers)
  Logistic Battalion "Mameli", in Vacile
 Anti-tank Company "Mameli", in Vacile
 Engineer Company "Mameli", in Vacile

 Armored Brigade "Ariete" 
  Armored Brigade "Ariete", in Pordenone
 Command and Signal Unit "Ariete", in Pordenone
  8th Tank Battalion "M.O. Secchiaroli", in Aviano, (M60A1 main battle tanks)
  10th Tank Battalion "M.O. Bruno", in Aviano, (M60A1 main battle tanks)
  13th Tank Battalion "M.O. Pascucci", in Cordenons, (Leopard 1A2 main battle tanks) (Reserve status from December 1989, reassigned to "Mantova" Brigade)
  27th Bersaglieri Battalion "Jamiano", in Aviano, (VCC-1 armored personnel carriers)
  20th Self-propelled Field Artillery Group "Piave", in Maniago, (M109 155mm self-propelled howitzers)
  Logistic Battalion "Ariete", in Maniago
 Anti-tank Company "Ariete", in Aviano
 Engineer Company "Ariete", in Maniago

 Armored Brigade "Pozzuolo del Friuli" 
  Armored Brigade "Pozzuolo del Friuli", in Palmanova
 Command and Signal Unit "Pozzuolo del Friuli" , in Palmanova
  4th Mechanized Squadrons Group "Genova Cavalleria", in Palmanova, (VCC-2 armored personnel carriers)
  5th Tank Squadrons Group "Lancieri di Novara", in Codroipo, (Leopard 1A2 main battle tanks)
  28th Tank Squadrons Group "Cavalleggeri di Treviso", in Palmanova, (Leopard 1A2 main battle tanks)
  120th Self-propelled Field Artillery Group "Po", in Palmanova, (M109 155mm self-propelled howitzers)
  Logistic Battalion "Pozzuolo del Friuli", in Visco
 Anti-tank Squadron "Pozzuolo del Friuli", in Palmanova
 Engineer Company "Pozzuolo del Friuli", in Palmanova

 Mechanized Brigade "Garibaldi" 
  Mechanized Brigade "Garibaldi", in Pordenone
 Command and Signal Unit "Garibaldi", in Pordenone
  7th Tank Battalion "M.O. Di Dio", in Vivaro, (M60A1 main battle tanks)
  3rd Bersaglieri Battalion "Cernaia", in Pordenone, (VCC-1 armored personnel carriers)
  11th Bersaglieri Battalion "Caprera", in Orcenico Superiore, (VCC-1 armored personnel carriers)
  26th Bersaglieri Battalion "Castelfidardo", in Maniago, (VCC-1 armored personnel carriers)
  120th Infantry (Fortifications) Battalion "Fornovo", in Ipplis di Premariacco
  19th Self-propelled Field Artillery Group "Rialto", in Sequals, (M109 155mm self-propelled howitzers)
  Logistic Battalion "Garibaldi", in Pordenone
 Anti-tank Company "Garibaldi", in Vivaro
 Engineer Company "Garibaldi", in Orcenico Superiore

 Mechanized Brigade "Vittorio Veneto" 
  Mechanized Brigade "Vittorio Veneto", in Villa Opicina
 Command and Signal Unit "Vittorio Veneto", in Villa Opicina
  2nd Mechanized Squadrons Group "Piemonte Cavalleria", in Villa Opicina, (VCC-2 armored personnel carriers)
  6th Tank Squadrons Group "Lancieri di Aosta", in Cervignano del Friuli, (Leopard 1A2 main battle tanks)
  9th Tank Squadrons Group "Lancieri di Firenze", in Sgonico, (Leopard 1A2 main battle tanks)
  12th Mechanized Squadrons Group "Cavalleggeri di Saluzzo", in Gorizia, (VCC-2 armored personnel carriers)
  1st Motorized Infantry Battalion "San Giusto", in Trieste
  33rd Infantry (Fortification) Battalion "Ardenza", in Fogliano Redipuglia
  8th Self-propelled Field Artillery Group "Pasubio", in Banne, (M109 155mm self-propelled howitzers)
  Logistic Battalion "Vittorio Veneto", in Cervignano del Friuli
 Anti-tank Squadron "Vittorio Veneto", in Banne
 Engineer Company "Vittorio Veneto", in Cervignano del Friuli

 Mechanized Brigade "Gorizia" 
  Mechanized Brigade "Gorizia", in Gorizia
 Command and Signal Unit "Gorizia", in Gorizia
  22nd Tank Battalion "M.O. Piccinini", in San Vito al Tagliamento, (Leopard 1A2 main battle tanks)
  41st Mechanized Infantry Battalion "Modena", in Villa Vicentina, (VCC-2 armored personnel carriers)
  53rd Infantry (Fortification) Battalion "Umbria", in Pavia di Udine
  63rd Infantry (Fortification) Battalion "Cagliari", in San Lorenzo Isontino
  82nd Mechanized Infantry Battalion "Torino", in Cormons, (VCC-2 armored personnel carriers)
  183rd Mechanized Infantry Battalion "Nembo", in Gradisca d'Isonzo, (VCC-2 armored personnel carriers)
  46th Self-propelled Field Artillery Group "Trento", in Gradisca d'Isonzo, (M109 155mm self-propelled howitzers)
  Logistic Battalion "Gorizia", in Gradisca d'Isonzo
 Anti-tank Company "Gorizia", in Gorizia
 Engineer Company "Gorizia", in Cormons

 Mechanized Brigade "Mantova" 
  Mechanized Brigade "Mantova", in Udine
 Command and Signal Unit at Mantua, in Udine
  63rd Tank Battalion "M.O. Fioritto", in Cordenons, (Leopard 1A2 main battle tanks)
  7th Reconnaissance Squadrons Group "Lancieri di Milano", in Orzano di Remanzacco  (two Leopard 1A2 tank companies and one VCC-2 mech infantry company, disbanded December 1989)
  52nd Infantry (Fortification) Battalion "Alpi", in Attimis
  59th Mechanized Infantry Battalion "Calabria", in Cividale del Friuli, (VCC-2 armored personnel carriers)
  76th Mechanized Infantry Battalion "Napoli", in Cividale del Friuli, (VCC-2 armored personnel carriers)
  114th Mechanized Infantry Battalion "Moriago", in Tricesimo, (VCC-2 armored personnel carriers)
  28th Self-propelled Field Artillery Group "Livorno", in Tarcento, (M109 155mm self-propelled howitzers)
  Logistic Battalion "Mantova", in Tricesimo
 Anti-tank Company "Mantova", in Tarcento
 Engineer Company "Mantova", in Tarcento

 Amphibious Troops Command 
 Amphibious Troops Command (Lagunari) in Venice-Lido
 Command and Signal Unit, in Venice-Lido
  1st Lagunari Battalion "Serenissima", in Malcontenta, (VCC-2 armored personnel carriers)
  Amphibious Battalion "Sile", in San Andrea, (LVTP-7 tracked amphibious personnel carriers)
 Recruits Training Company, in Venice-Lido

 3rd Missile Brigade "Aquileia" 
  3rd Missile Brigade "Aquileia", in Portogruaro
  3rd Missile Group "Volturno" in Oderzo (HQ and 1st Battery) and Codogné (2nd and 3rd Battery) (MGM-52 Lance tactical ballistic missiles)
  27th Heavy Self-propelled Artillery Group "Marche", in Udine, (M110 203mm self-propelled howitzers)
  13th Target Acquisition Group "Aquileia", in Verona
  13th Signal Battalion "Mauria", in Portogruaro
  13th Logistic Battalion "Aquileia", in Portogruaro
  92nd Infantry (Recruits Training) Battalion "Basilicata", in Foligno
 1st Security Fusiliers Company, Codogné
 2nd Security Fusiliers Company, Portogruaro
 3rd Security Fusiliers Company, Oderzo
 4th Security Fusiliers Company, Udine
 Engineer Company "Aquileia", in Portogruaro

 Northwestern Military Region 
 Northwestern Military Region (R.M.N.O.), in Turin, responsible for the regions of Piedmont, Aosta, Liguria and Lombardy
 R.M.N.O. Command Unit, in Turin
  4th Infantry (Recruits Training) Battalion "Guastalla", in Asti
  11th Infantry (Recruits Training) Battalion "Casale", in Casale Monferrato
  14th Bersaglieri (Recruits Training) Battalion "Sernaglia", in Albenga
  16th Infantry (Recruits Training) Battalion "Savona", in Savona
  23rd Infantry (Recruits Training) Battalion "Como", in Como
  26th Infantry (Recruits Training) Battalion "Bergamo", in Diano Castello
  72nd Infantry (Recruits Training) Battalion "Puglie", in Albenga
  41st Signal Battalion "Fréjus", in Turin
  1st Mixed Transport Battalion "Monviso", in Turin
 1st Supply Unit, in Alessandria
 1st Provisions Supply Company, in Turin
 1st Medical Company, in Milan
 Main Military Hospital, in Milan
 Military Hospital Type A, in Turin
 Military Hospital Type B, in Genoa
 Military Hospital Type B, in Brescia
  Alpine Military School, in Aosta
 Command Company, in Aosta
  Alpini Battalion "Aosta", in Aosta (from 9 November 1989 "Tactical and Logistic Support Battalion "Aosta")
 Training Battalion, in Aosta
 Logistic Company, in Aosta
 "Piemonte" Motorized Brigade (Wartime mobilization)
 Command and Signal Unit (to be formed by elements of the Northwest Military Command and the Alpine Military School)
 117th Motorized Infantry Battalion (from the "Mondovì" Alpini Recruits Training Battalion)
 217th Motorized Infantry Battalion (from the 4th Infantry Recruits Training Battalion "Guastalla'')
 317th Motorized Infantry Battalion (from the "Aosta" Alpini Battalion)
 117th Field Artillery Group (M114 155mm towed howitzers, from 3rd Corps elements)
 Logistic Battalion "Piemonte" (from 3rd Corps elements)
 Engineer Company "Piemonte" (from the 131st Combat Engineers Battalion "Ticino")

 Northeastern Military Region 
 Northeastern Military Region (R.M.N.E.), in Padua, responsible for the regions Veneto, Friuli-Venezia Giulia and Trentino-Alto Adige/Südtirol
 R.M.N.E. Command Unit, in Padua
  7th Infantry (Recruits Training) Battalion "Cuneo", in Udine
  32nd Signal Battalion "Valles", in Padua
  42nd Signal Battalion "Pordoi", in Padua
 23rd Signal Company, in Castelnuovo del Garda providing communication services at the secret West Star bunker complex, which in case of war would have housed NATO's COMLANDSOUTH (Command Allied Land Forces Southern Europe) and COMFIVEATAF (Command 5th Allied Tactical Air Force)
  14th Mixed Transport Battalion "Flavia", in Montorio Veronese

 Tuscan-Emilian Military Region 
 Tuscan-Emilian Military Region (R.M.T.E.), in Florence, responsible for the regions Tuscany and Emilia-Romagna
 R.M.T.E. Command Unit, in Florence
  2nd Bridge Engineer Regiment, in Piacenza
 1st Battalion, in Legnago
 2nd (Reserve) Battalion, in Piacenza
 3rd Battalion, in Piacenza
  Railway Engineer Regiment, in Castel Maggiore
 1st Disassemblable Metal Bridges Battalion, in Castel Maggiore
 2nd Operations Battalion, in Turin
 3rd Heavy Field Artillery Group (Reserve), in Modena (M114 155mm towed howitzers)
  8th Heavy Field Artillery Group "Marmore", in Modena, (M114 155mm towed howitzers)
  43rd Signal Battalion "Abetone", in Florence
  7th Mixed Transport Battalion, in Florence
 27th Army Light Aviation Squadrons Group "Mercurio", at Florence-Peretola Air Base
 271st Light Airplanes Squadron (SM-1019)
 427th Recon Helicopters Squadron (AB-206)

 Paratroopers Brigade "Folgore" 
  "'Paratroopers Brigade "Folgore""', in Livorno
 Command and Signal Unit "Folgore", in Livorno
 1st Carabinieri Paratroopers Battalion "Tuscania", in Livorno
  2nd Paratroopers Battalion "Tarquinia", in Livorno
  5th Paratroopers Battalion "El Alamein", in Siena
  9th Paratroopers Assault Battalion "Col Moschin", in Livorno
  185th Paratroopers Field Artillery Group "Viterbo", in Livorno, (M56 105mm pack howitzers)
  Military Parachutist School, in Pisa
  3rd Paratroopers Training Battalion "Poggio Rusco", in Pisa
  Paratroopers Logistic Battalion "Folgore", in Pisa
 26th Army Light Aviation Squadrons Group "Giove", at Pisa-San Giusto Air Base
 426th Multirole Helicopter Squadron (AB-205)
 526th Recon Helicopters Squadron (AB-206)
 Paratroopers Engineer Company "Folgore", in Lucca

 Motorized Brigade "Friuli" 
  Motorized Brigade "Friuli", in Florence
  Command and Signal Unit "Friuli", in Florence
  19th Armored Battalion "M.O. Tumiati", in Florence (two Leopard 1A2 tank companies and one VCC-2 mech infantry company)
 35th Motorized (Reserve) Infantry Battalion "Pistoia", in Pistoia
  78th Motorized Infantry Battalion "Lupi di Toscana", in Scandicci
  87th Motorized Infantry Battalion "Senio", in Pistoia
  225th Infantry (Recruits Training) Battalion "Arezzo", in Arezzo
  35th Field Artillery Group "Riolo" in Pistoia, (two batteries with M114 155mm towed howitzers, one battery with M56 105mm pack howitzers and one battery with Stinger AA Missiles)
  Logistic Battalion "Friuli", in Coverciano
 Anti-tank Company "Friuli", in Scandicci
 Engineer Company "Friuli", in Florence

 Central Military Region 
 Central Military Region (R.M.C.), in Rome, responsible for the regions Lazio, Molise, Marche, Abruzzo and Umbria
 R.M.C. Command Unit, in Rome
  "'Cavalry and Infantry School"', in Cesano
 77th Mechanized (Recruits Training) Battalion "M.O. Mattei", in Cesano (become Tactical and Logistic Support Battalion "M.O.Mattei" on 25 July 1989)
  "'Artillery School"', in Bracciano
  1st Artillery (Training) Group "Cacciatore delle Alpi", in Bracciano 
 1st battery with M114 155mm towed howitzers
 2nd battery with FH-70 155mm towed howitzers
 3rd battery with M109 self-propelled howitzers
 4th battery with SP-70 self-propelled howitzers and MLRS (disbanded during 1989)
  "'Engineer School"', in Rome
 4th Engineer (Recruits Training) Battalion "M.O. Montorsi", in Rome
  8th Mechanized Squadrons Group "Lancieri di Montebello", in Rome
  28th Infantry (Recruits Training) Battalion "Pavia", in Pesaro
  80th Infantry (Recruits Training) Battalion "Roma", in Cassino
  84th Infantry (Recruits Training) Battalion "Venezia", in Falconara Marittima
  123rd Infantry (Recruits Training) Battalion "Chieti", in Chieti
  6th Engineer Battalion "Trasimeno", in Rome
  44th Signal Battalion "Penne", in Rome
 26th Signal Company, in Rome
  8th Mixed Transport Battalion "Casilina", in Rome
 28th Army Light Aviation Squadrons Group "Tucano", at Roma-Urbe Air Base
 281st Light Airplanes Squadron (SM-1019)
 428th Recon Helicopters Squadron (AB-206)
 "Lazio" Mechanized Brigade (Wartime mobilization)
 Command and Signal Unit (to be formed by elements of the Central Military Command and the Infantry and Cavalry Military School)
 8th Mechanized Squadron Group "Lancieri di Montebello" (see above)
 77th Mechanized Infantry Battalion (see above)
 80th Motorized Infantry Battalion (from the 80th Infantry Training Battalion "Roma")
 1st Artillery Group "Cacciatori delle Alpi" (see above)
 Logistic Battalion "Lazio" (from the Transports and Materials School)
 Engineer Company "Lazio" (from the Engineers School)

 Mechanized Brigade "Granatieri di Sardegna" 
  Mechanized Brigade "Granatieri di Sardegna", in Rome
 Command and Signal Unit "Granatieri di Sardegna", in Rome
  6th Tank Battalion "M.O. Scapuzzi", in Civitavecchia, (Leopard 1A2 main battle tanks)
  1st Bersaglieri Battalion "La Marmora", in Civitavecchia, (VCC-2 armored personnel carriers)
  1st Mechanized Granatieri Battalion "Assietta", in Rome, (VCC-1 armored personnel carriers)
  2nd Mechanized Granatieri Battalion "Cengio", in Rome, (VCC-1 armored personnel carriers)
  3rd Granatieri (Recruits Training) Battalion "Guardie", in Orvieto
  13th Field Artillery Group "Magliana", in Civitavecchia, (M114 155mm towed howitzers)
  Logistic Battalion "Granatieri di Sardegna", in Civitavecchia
 Anti-tank Company "Granatieri di Sardegna", in Civitavecchia
 Engineer Company "Granatieri di Sardegna", in Civitavecchia

 Motorized Brigade "Acqui" 
  Motorized Brigade "Acqui", in L'Aquila
 Command and Signal Unit "Acqui", in L'Aquila
  9th Armored Battalion "M.O. Butera", in L'Aquila, (two Leopard 1A2 tanks companies and one M113 mech infantry company)
  17th Infantry (Recruits Training) Battalion "San Martino", in Sulmona
  57th Motorized Infantry Battalion "Abruzzi", in Sora
 70th Motorized (Reserve) Infantry Battalion "Ancona", in Sulmona
  130th Motorized Infantry Battalion "Perugia", in Spoleto
  48th Field Artillery Group "Taro", in L'Aquila, (M114 155mm towed howitzers)
  Logistic Battalion "Acqui", in L'Aquila
 Anti-tank Company "Acqui", in L'Aquila
 Engineer Company "Acqui", in L'Aquila

 Southern Military Region 
 Southern Military Region (R.M.M.), in Naples, responsible for the regions of Apulia, Basilicata, Campania and Calabria
 R.M.M. Command Unit, in Naples
  Armored Troops School, in Lecce
 Command Unit, in Lecce
 21st Tank (Recruits Training) Battalion "M.O. Scognamiglio" (Reserve), in Lecce
 31st Tank (Recruits Training) Battalion "M.O. Andreani", in Lecce
 Logistic Unit, in Lecce
  47th Infantry (Recruits Training) Battalion "Salento", in Barletta
  48th Infantry (Recruits Training) Battalion "Ferrara", in Bari
  89th Infantry (Recruits Training) Battalion "Salerno", in Salerno
  91st Infantry (Recruits Training) Battalion "Lucania", in Potenza
  244th Infantry (Recruits Training) Battalion "Cosenza", in Cosenza
  2nd Field Artillery Group "Potenza", in Barletta, (M114 155mm towed howitzers)
  9th Field Artillery Group "Foggia", in Foggia, (M114 155mm towed howitzers)
 10th Artillery Specialists Battery, in Foggia
  21st Engineer Battalion "Timavo", in Caserta
  45th Signal Battalion "Vulture", in Naples
  10th Mixed Transport Battalion "Appia", in Naples
 Logistic Battalion "Persano" , in Persano (activated 30 April 1989 to prepare for the arrival of the "Garibaldi" Brigade)
 20th Army Light Aviation Squadrons Group "Andromeda", at Salerno-Pontecagnano Air Base
 201st Light Airplanes Squadron (SM-1019)
 420th Recon Helicopters Squadron (AB-206)
 520th Multirole Helicopters Squadron (AB-212)
 10th Supply Unit, in Bari
 10th Provisions Supply Company, in Naples
 10th Medical Company, in Bari
 Military Hospital Type A, in Bari
 Military Hospital Type A, in Caserta
 Military Hospital Type B, in Naples
 Military Hospital Type B, in Catanzaro
 "Puglie" Armoured Brigade (Wartime mobilization)
 Command and Signal Unit (to be formed by elements of the Southern Military Region Command and the Armored Troops School)
 21st Armored Battalion "M.O. Scognamiglio" (see above)
 31st Armored Battalion "M.O. Andreani"(see above)
 Motorized Infantry Battalion (from Infantry Training Battalions)
 Artillery Group (from Southern Military Region assets)
 Logistic Battalion "Puglie" (from Southern Military Region and Armored Troops School)
 Engineer Company "Puglie" (from Southern Military Region assets)

 Mechanized Brigade "Pinerolo" 
  Mechanized Brigade "Pinerolo", in Bari
 Command and Signal Unit "Pinerolo", in Bari
  60th Tank Battalion "M.O. Locatelli", in Altamura, (Leopard 1A2 main battle tanks)
  9th Mechanized Infantry Battalion "Bari", in Trani, (VCC-1 armored personnel carriers)
  13th Mechanized Infantry Battalion "Valbella", in Avellino, (VCC-1 armored personnel carriers)
  67th Bersaglieri Battalion "Fagarè", in Persano, (VCC-1 armored personnel carriers)
  231st Infantry (Recruits Training) Battalion "Avellino", in Avellino
  11th Field Artillery Group "Teramo", in Persano, (M114 155mm towed howitzers)
  Logistic Battalion "Pinerolo", in Bari
 Anti-tank Company "Pinerolo", in Bari
 Engineer Company "Pinerolo", in Trani

 Sicily Military Region 
 Sicily Military Region (R.M.SI.), in Palermo (Sicily region)
 R.M.SI. Command Unit, in Palermo
  60th Infantry (Recruits Training) Battalion "Col di Lana", in Trapani
  51st Engineer Battalion "Simeto", in Palermo (raised 1 October 1983)
  46th Signal Battalion "Mongibello", in Palermo
  11th Transport Battalion "Etnea", in Palermo
 30th Army Light Aviation Squadrons Group "Pegaso", at Catania-Fontanarossa Air Base
 301st Light Airplanes Squadron (SM.1019A planes)
 430th Reconnaissance Helicopters Squadron (AB 206 reconnaissance helicopters)
 530th Multirole Helicopters Squadron (AB 204B/205 multirole helicopters)
 11th Supply Unit, in Messina
 11th Medical Company, in Palermo
 11th Provisions Supply Company, in Palermo
 11th Army Repair Workshop, in Palermo
 Type B Military Hospital, in Palermo
 Type B Military Hospital, in Messina
 Infantry Battalion "isole Minori", on Pantelleria island

 Motorized Brigade "Aosta" 
  Motorized Brigade "Aosta", in Messina
 "Aosta" Command and Signal Battalion, in Messina
  5th Motorized Infantry Battalion "Col della Berretta", in Messina
  62nd Motorized Infantry Battalion "Sicilia", in Catania
  141st Motorized Infantry Battalion "Catanzaro", in Palermo
  62nd Armored Battalion "M.O. Jero", in Catania (two Leopard 1A2 tanks companies and one M113 mech infantry company)
  24th Field Artillery Group "Peloritani", in Messina, with M114 155mm towed howitzers
  Logistic Battalion "Aosta", in Messina
 Anti-tank Company "Aosta", in Messina
 Engineer Company "Aosta", in Syracuse

 Sardinia Military Command 
 Sardinia Military Command (CMS), in Cagliari, responsible for the island of Sardinia
 CMS Command Unit, in Cagliari
  45th Infantry (Recruits Training) Battalion "Arborea", in Macomer
 21st Army Light Aviation Squadrons Group "Orsa Maggiore", at Cagliari-Elmas Air Base
211st Light Airplanes Squadron (SM-1019)
 421st Recon Helicopters Squadron (AB-206)
 521st Multirole Helicopters Squadron (AB-205)
  47th Signal Battalion "Gennargentu", in Cagliari
 12th Mixed Transport Unit, in Cagliari
 12th Supply Unit, in Nuoro
 12th Medical Company, in Cagliari
 12th Provisions Supply Company, in Cagliari
 Military Hospital Type B, in Cagliari

 Motorized Brigade "Sassari" 
  Motorized Brigade "Sassari", in Sassari
 Command and Signal Unit "Sassari", in Sassari
  1st Armored Infantry (Training) Regiment, in Capo Teulada
 1st Armored Infantry Battalion
 Command Company 
 1st Tank Company, 16x Leopard 1A2 main battle tanks
 2nd Bersaglieri Company, 13x M113 armored personnel carriers
 Reconnaissance Helicopter Squadron, 6x AB-47 helicopters
 Self-propelled Artillery Battery, 6x M109 155mm 
 2nd Armored Infantry Battalion (Reserve)
 Logistic Unit
  151st Motorized Infantry Battalion "Sette Comuni", in Cagliari
  152nd Motorized Infantry Battalion "Sassari", in Sassari
 170th Artillery Group (Reserve)

 Anti-aircraft Artillery Command 
  Anti-aircraft Artillery Command, in Padua
 Command Unit, in Padua
  4th Anti-aircraft Missile Artillery Regiment "Peschiera", in Mantua
 Command Battery, Mantua
 1st Anti-aircraft Missile Artillery Group, in Ravenna, (MIM-23 Hawk surface-to-air missiles)
 2nd Anti-aircraft Missile Artillery Group, in Mantua, (MIM-23 Hawk surface-to-air missiles)
 24th Signal Company, in Mantua
  5th Anti-aircraft Missile Artillery Regiment "Pescara", in Mestre
 Command Battery, Mestre
 1st Anti-aircraft Missile Artillery Group, in San Donà di Piave, (MIM-23 Hawk surface-to-air missiles)
 2nd Anti-aircraft Missile Artillery Group, in Rovigo, (MIM-23 Hawk surface-to-air missiles)
 25th Signal Company, in Mestre
  121st Light Anti-aircraft Artillery Regiment "Ravenna", in Bologna
 1st Light Anti-aircraft Artillery Group, in Bologna
 2nd Light Anti-aircraft Artillery Group, in Mestre
 3rd Light Anti-aircraft Artillery Group, in Rimini
 4th Light Anti-aircraft Artillery Group, in Ferrara
  17th Light Anti-aircraft Artillery Group "Sforzesca", at Villafranca Air Base
 Command Battery, at Villafranca Air Base
 1st Light Anti-aircraft Artillery Battery, at Villafranca Air Base
 2nd Light Anti-aircraft Artillery Battery, at Ghedi Air Base
 3rd Light Anti-aircraft Artillery Battery, at Istrana Air Base
 4th Light Anti-aircraft Artillery Battery, at Rimini Air Base
 5th Light Anti-aircraft Artillery Battery, at Cervia Air Base
 21st Light Anti-aircraft Artillery Group "Sparviero" (Reserve), in Villafranca
 22nd Light Anti-aircraft Artillery Group "Alcione" (Reserve), in Bologna
  235th Infantry (Recruits Training) Battalion "Piceno", in Ascoli Piceno
 Anti-aircraft Missiles Supply and Repairs Unit, in Montichiari
 Anti-aircraft Artillery Materiel Supply and Repairs Unit, in Bologna

 Units directly reporting to the Army General Staff 
 Army General Staff''', in Rome
  1st Army Light Aviation Regiment "Antares", in Viterbo
 11th Transport Helicopter Squadrons Group "Ercole", in Viterbo, (CH-47C Chinook heavy-lift helicopters)
 111st Medium Transport Helicopters Squadron
 112nd Medium Transport Helicopters Squadron
 120th Medium Transport Helicopters Squadron
 51st Multirole Helicopter Squadrons Group "Leone", in Viterbo, (AB-412 utility helicopters)
 511th Multirole Helicopters Squadron 
 512th Multirole Helicopters Squadron
 39th Helicopter Squadrons Group "Drago", in Alghero-Fertilia, supporting the military intelligence agency SISMI
 399th Light Airplanes Squadron ((SM-1019) 
 Multirole Helicopters Squadron (A109C)
 ItalAir Squadron, in Naqoura (Lebanon, part of the UNIFIL mission, with AB-205)
  1st CBRN-defense Battalion "Etruria", in Rieti
  8th ELINT Battalion "Tonale", in Anzio
  9th Electronic Warfare Battalion "Rombo", in Anzio
  10th Signal Battalion "Lanciano", in Rome
  11th Signal Battalion "Leonessa", in Civitavecchia
  10th Joint Transport Battalion "Salaria", in Rome
  11th Transport Battalion "Flaminia", in Rome
  1st Army Aviation Maintenance Battalion "Idra", in Bracciano
  2nd Army Aviation Maintenance Battalion "Orione", in Bologna
  3rd Army Aviation Maintenance Battalion "Aquila", in Orio al Serio
  4th Army Aviation Maintenance Battalion "Scorpione", in Viterbo

See also 
 Structure of the Italian Army for the current structure of the Italian Army.

References

Italian Army
Army units and formations of Italy
Army units and formations of Italy post-1946
Military history of Italy
Wikipedia outlines